The Historical Ryan STA was an American homebuilt aircraft that was designed and produced by the Historical Aircraft Corporation of Nucla, Colorado. The aircraft was an 85% scale replica of the original Ryan STA and when it was available was supplied as a kit for amateur construction.

Design and development
The aircraft featured a wire-braced and strut-braced low-wing, two seats in separate tandem open cockpits with windshields, fixed conventional landing gear and a single engine in tractor configuration.

The aircraft fuselage was made from welded steel tubing, while the wings had wooden spars and ribs covered in doped aircraft fabric. Several prefabricated components were supplied as part of the kit, including the fuselage frame, landing gear, engine mount and tail assembly. The manufacturer rated the STA kit as suitable for beginners and estimated the construction time from the supplied kit as 1500 hours. The kit could be completed to represent an STA, a military PT-16 or a PT-20.

Operational history
In January 2014 no examples remained registered in the United States with the Federal Aviation Administration. Although one aircraft had been registered in 1997, it was listed as destroyed and deregistered in 2002. It is likely that no examples exist today.

Specifications (STA)

References

Ryan STA
1990s United States sport aircraft
Single-engined tractor aircraft
Low-wing aircraft
Homebuilt aircraft
Replica aircraft